The Unity Party is the name of several political parties around the world, including:

Current-day parties with that name include:
Unity Party (Australia)
Unity Party (Azerbaijan)
Unity Party (Hungary, 2009)
 Unity (Haiti) (Inite), est. 2009
 Unity Party of Kenya (UPK, est. 2011)
Unity (Latvian political party)
Unity Party (Liberia)
Unity Party (Sierra Leone)
Unity (Slovenia) (Sloga), est. 2018
Unity Party (South Ossetia)
Unity (Sweden) (Enhet)
Unity Party of America

Historical parties of the name include:
Batasuna ("Unity")
British Columbia Unity Party
Latvian Unity Party
Unity (Northern Ireland)
Unity (Russian political party)
Unity (Ukraine)
Unity Party (China)
Unity Party (Hungary)
Unity Party (Israel)
Unity Party (Japan)
 Unity Party of Nigeria (UPN, active 1978-1983)
Unity Party (Quebec)
Unity Party (Turkey)
Yedinstvo, a faction within the Russian Social Democratic Labor Party

Afghanistan
Islamic Unity Party of Afghanistan
National Islamic Unity Party of Afghanistan
People's Islamic Unity Party of Afghanistan

See also
National Unity Party (disambiguation)
Socialist Unity Party (disambiguation)
United Party (disambiguation)

Political party disambiguation pages